Chaudhary Tejveer Singh (born 2 December 1959) Shahpur, Mathura district, Uttar Pradesh) is a leader of Bharatiya Janata Party from Uttar Pradesh. He served as member of the Lok Sabha representing Mathura (Lok Sabha constituency). He was elected to 11th, 12th and 13th Lok Sabha.

Chaudhary Tejveer Singh, former MP of Mathura  has been elected unopposed as the chairman of Uttar Pradesh Cooperative Bank. With this, Samajwadi Party leader and former minister Shivpal Singh Yadav has been discharged. He is the present Uttar Pradesh, co-operative chairman

Political career

May 1996      : Elected to 11th Lok Sabha
March 1998    : Elected to 12th Lok Sabha
October 1999  : Elected to 13th Lok Sabha

References

India MPs 1996–1997
People from Mathura district
1959 births
Living people
Bharatiya Janata Party politicians from Uttar Pradesh
India MPs 1998–1999
India MPs 1999–2004
Lok Sabha members from Uttar Pradesh